Baya M. Harrison, Jr. (1912 in Tampa, Florida – 1975) was a politician and an attorney in Florida.  He served as Chairman of the Florida Board of Control from 1960–1964. Harrison greatly impacted the State University System of Florida and helped desegregate Florida colleges and universities. He served as President of the Florida Bar in 1957.

Harrison graduated from the University of Florida College of Law in 1935 and was a member of Alpha Tau Omega while there. He served in the United States Army during World War II, and earned the rank of colonel. Harrison led the Japanese-American Squadron (442 Regimental Combat Team). While in the service he received the Bronze Star for Valor in combat.

See also

Florida Board of Regents
State University System of Florida

References

External links
Official Profile
St. Petersburg Times article about Harrison

1912 births
1975 deaths
Politicians from Tampa, Florida
United States Army colonels
United States Army personnel of World War II
Military personnel from Florida
Fredric G. Levin College of Law alumni
Florida lawyers
20th-century American lawyers